Bršlenovica is a small settlement in the hills west of Trojane in the Municipality of Lukovica in the eastern part of the Upper Carniola region of Slovenia.

References

External links 
Bršlenovica on Geopedia

Populated places in the Municipality of Lukovica